Vox Luminis are a Belgian early music vocal ensemble led by Lionel Meunier. Their recording of Heinrich Schütz's Musicalische Exequien for Ricercar won a Gramophone Award and International Classical Music Awards (ICMA) in 2012.

Recordings (choice)
 Domenico Scarlatti: Stabat Mater a 10 voci. Te Deum. Salve Regina. Vox Luminis Ensemble  Ricercar 2007
 Samuel Scheidt - Cantiones Sacræ Vox Luminis, Lionel Meunier  Ricercar 2010
 Heinrich Schütz: Musicalische Exequien Ricercar,	
 English Royal Funeral Music. Morley Purcell Tomkins Weelkes Les Trompettes des Plaisirs, Lingua Franca & Vox Luminis, Lionel Meunier 2013
 Reinhard Keiser: Brockes-Passion. Tóth, Van Elsacker, Kooij, Les Muffatti and Vox Luminis, Peter Van Heyghen Ramee 2014
 Lassus: Biographie Musicale Volume V Lassus l’Européen Musique en Wallonie 2015
 J. Bach, J.Chr. Bach & J.M. Bach: Motetten   Ricercar 2015
 Johann Fux: Kaiserrequiem Kerll: Missa pro defunctis. Vox Luminis, Lionel Meunier  Ricercar 2016
 J.S. Bach: Actus Tragicus – Cantatas BWV 106, 150, 131, 12, Alpha, 2016
 "Ein feste Burg ist unser Gott" Luther and the Music of the Reformation, Bart Jacobs (organ) Vox Luminis, Lionel Meunier  Ricercar 2017
 2018: Henry Purcell, King Arthur (Alpha 430)
 2019: Bach - Kantaten (Ricercar RIC 401)
 2020: Andreas Hammerschmidt, Ach Jesus stirbt (Ricercar, RIC 418) 
 2021: Heinrich Ignaz Franz Biber, Requiem, with Freiburger Barockkonsort (Alpha 665)

References

Early music groups
Belgian choirs
Belgian classical music groups